Enrique Molina Sobrino is a Mexican businessman known for creating the biggest Pepsi bottling group in Mexico, named Gemex. He also created an business empire in the production of sugar. In 2002 he sold Pepsi Group in Mexico to The Pepsi Bottling Group, the largest Pepsi bottler in the world partially owned by Pepsi, for 1.5 billion dollars.

Molina also was part owner of Grupo Financiero Banamex when it was privatized by the Salinas administration. Banamex is now owned by Citibank.

References

Mexican businesspeople
Living people
Year of birth missing (living people)